Francisco López (born 12 February 1965) is a Spanish sprint canoeist who competed from the mid-1980s to the early 1990s. Competing in three Summer Olympics, he earned his best finish of ninth in both the C-1 500 m and C-1 1000 m events at Los Angeles in 1984.

References

1965 births
Canoeists at the 1984 Summer Olympics
Canoeists at the 1988 Summer Olympics
Canoeists at the 1992 Summer Olympics
Living people
Olympic canoeists of Spain
Spanish male canoeists
20th-century Spanish people